Statistical thinking is one of the tools for process analysis. Statistical thinking relates processes and statistics, and is based on the following principles:
 All work occurs in a system of interconnected processes.
 Variation exists in all processes
 Understanding and reducing variation are keys to success.

W. Edwards Deming promoted the concepts of statistical thinking, using two powerful experiments:

1. The Red Bead experiment, in which workers are tasked with running a more or less random procedure, yet the lowest "performing" workers are fired. The experiment demonstrates how the natural variability in a process can dwarf the contribution of individual workers' talent. 

2. The Funnel experiment, again demonstrating that natural variability in a process can loom larger than it ought to.

The takehome message from the experiments is that before management adjusts a process -- such as by firing seemingly underperforming employees, or by making physical changes to an apparatus -- they should consider all sources of variation in the process that led to the performance outcome.

Statistical thinking is a recognised method used as part of Six Sigma methodologies.

See also
Systems thinking

References

Statistical process control
Six Sigma